The Journal of Consulting and Clinical Psychology is a monthly academic journal published by the American Psychological Association. Its focus is on treatment and prevention in all areas of clinical and clinical-health psychology and especially on topics that appeal to a broad clinical-scientist and practitioner audience. The editor-in-chief is Joanne Davila (Stony Brook University).

The journal was established in 1937 by the Association of Consulting Psychologists as the Journal of Consulting Psychology. With the expansion of the consulting field, the journal obtained its current name in 1968 to more accurately reflect the research it published and the interests of its readership.

The journal has implemented the Transparency and Openness Promotion (TOP) Guidelines.  The TOP Guidelines provide structure to research planning and reporting and aim to make research more transparent, accessible, and reproducible.

Abstracting and indexing 
The journal is abstracted and indexed by MEDLINE/PubMed, APA PsycINFO, and the Social Sciences Citation Index. According to the Journal Citation Reports, the journal has a 2020 impact factor of 5.348.

See also
 Experimental and Clinical Psychopharmacology
 Clinical Practice in Pediatric Psychology

References

External links 
 

Abnormal psychology journals
American Psychological Association academic journals
English-language journals
Publications established in 1937
Bimonthly journals
Clinical psychology journals
1937 establishments in the United States
Psychotherapy journals